The 2001 Portuguese presidential election was held on 14 January.

The victory of incumbent president Jorge Sampaio was never in doubt and the turnout was therefore quite low (49.71%). Again, the incumbent president was reelected, like what happened with Mário Soares and Ramalho Eanes.

As the re-election of the left-wing president was almost certain, both the Portuguese Communist Party and the Left Bloc, the latter for its first time, presented their own candidates, as their support against the right-wing candidate was not necessary. The Communist Party of the Portuguese Workers also presented its own candidate for the first time in its history, Garcia Pereira.

On the right, Ferreira do Amaral was supported by the two major parties, the Social Democratic Party and the People's Party which, again, could not achieve their old objective of electing a right-wing president for the first time since the Carnation Revolution.

Procedure
Any Portuguese citizen over 35 years old has the opportunity to run for president. In order to do so it is necessary to gather between 7500 and 15000 signatures and submit them to the Portuguese Constitutional Court.

According to the Portuguese Constitution, to be elected, a candidate needs a majority of votes. If no candidate gets this majority there will take place a second round between the two most voted candidates.

Candidates

Jorge Sampaio, President since 1996 and eligible for a second term, leader of the PS between 1989 and 1992, supported by the Socialist Party;
Joaquim Martins Ferreira do Amaral, former minister of public works of Cavaco Silva government between 1990 and 1995, supported by the Social Democratic Party and by the People's Party;
António Abreu, alderman in Lisbon between 1997 and 2001, supported by the Portuguese Communist Party;
Fernando Rosas, Portuguese academic and politician, supported by the Left Bloc;
Garcia Pereira, Secretary-General of the PCTP/MRPP;

Unsuccessful candidacies 
There were also four candidates rejected by the Portuguese Constitutional Court for not complying with the legal requirement of being proposed by 7500 voters:
 Pedro Maria Braga;
 Maria Teresa Lameiro;
 Josué Rodrigues Pedro;
 Manuel João Vieira;

These four candidates were present in the draw of the ballot position, but did not appear in the final ballot.

Campaign period

Party slogans

Candidates' debates

Opinion polls

Results
Summary of the 14 January 2001 Portuguese presidential election results
|-
!style="background-color:#E9E9E9;text-align:left;" colspan="2" rowspan="2"|Candidates 
!style="background-color:#E9E9E9;text-align:left;" rowspan="2"|Supporting parties 	
!style="background-color:#E9E9E9;text-align:right;" colspan="2"|First round
|-
!style="background-color:#E9E9E9;text-align:right;"|Votes
!style="background-color:#E9E9E9;text-align:right;"|%
|-
| style="width:10px;background-color:#FF66FF;text-align:center;" |
| style="text-align:left;" |Jorge Sampaio
| style="text-align:left;" |Socialist Party
| style="text-align:right;" |2,401,015
| style="text-align:right;" |55.55
|-
| style="width:5px;background-color:#FF9900;text-align:center;" | 
| style="text-align:left;" |Ferreira do Amaral 
| style="text-align:left;" |Social Democratic Party, People's Party
| style="text-align:right;" |1,498,948
| style="text-align:right;" |34.68
|-
| style="width:5px;background-color:red;text-align:center;" |  
| style="text-align:left;" |António Abreu
| style="text-align:left;" |Portuguese Communist Party, Ecologist Party "The Greens"
| style="text-align:right;" |223,196
| style="text-align:right;" |5.16
|-
| style="width:5px;background-color:#8B0000;text-align:center;" |
| style="text-align:left;" |Fernando Rosas
| style="text-align:left;" |Left Bloc
| style="text-align:right;" |129,840
| style="text-align:right;" |3.00
|-
| style="width:5px;background-color:#CC0000;text-align:center;" |
| style="text-align:left;" |António Garcia Pereira
| style="text-align:left;" |Portuguese Workers' Communist Party
| style="text-align:right;" |68,900
| style="text-align:right;" |1.59
|-
|colspan="3" style="text-align:left;background-color:#E9E9E9"|Total valid
|width="65" style="text-align:right;background-color:#E9E9E9"|4,321,899
|width="40" style="text-align:right;background-color:#E9E9E9"|100.00
|-
| style="text-align:right;" colspan="3" |Blank ballots
|width="65" tyle="text-align:right;" |82,391
|width="40" tyle="text-align:right;" |1.85
|-
| style="text-align:right;" colspan="3" |Invalid ballots
|width="65" tyle="text-align:right;" |45,510
|width="40" tyle="text-align:right;" |1.02
|-
|colspan="3" style="text-align:left;background-color:#E9E9E9"|Total
|width="65" style="text-align:right;background-color:#E9E9E9"|4,449,800
|width="40" style="text-align:right;background-color:#E9E9E9"|
|-
|colspan=3|Registered voters/turnout
||8,950,905||49.71
|-
| colspan=5 style="text-align:left;" |Source: Comissão Nacional de Eleições 
|}

Maps

References

Notes

External links
Portuguese Electoral Commission
 NSD: European Election Database - Portugal publishes regional level election data; allows for comparisons of election results, 1990-2010

See also
 President of Portugal
 Portugal
 Politics of Portugal

2001 elections in Portugal
2001
January 2001 events in Europe